O'Reilly Island is an uninhabited island in Nunavut Territory, Canada. It lies to the south of King William Island and to the west of the Klutschak and Adelaide Peninsulas, in the easternmost part of the Queen Maud Gulf.

History
The island and especially the islet to the northwest was extensively used by the Thule and later Inuit peoples to hunt seal and caribou.

The area runs from Point A to Point B to Point C to Point D.

References

Uninhabited islands of Kitikmeot Region